Sian is a rural locality (a selo) in Siansky Selsoviet of Zeysky District, Amur Oblast, Russia. The population was 63 as of 2018. There are 4 streets.

Geography 
Sian is located 85 km southwest of Zeya (the district's administrative centre) by road. Chalbachi is the nearest rural locality.

References 

Rural localities in Zeysky District